The Great Boomerang is a 1941 non-fiction book by Ion Idriess.

It contains his plans for developing the north of Australia. Idriess proposed diverting rivers from Queensland to create an inland sea.

References

1941 non-fiction books
Australian non-fiction books
Books by Ion Idriess
Angus & Robertson books